John McCallum Dowding (28 January 1881 – 11 May 1960) was an Australian rules footballer who played with St Kilda in the Victorian Football League (VFL). He also played for Prahran and Brighton in the Victorian Football Association (VFA).

References

External links 

Jack Dowding's playing statistics from The VFA Project

1881 births
1960 deaths
Australian rules footballers from Victoria (Australia)
Australian Rules footballers: place kick exponents
St Kilda Football Club players
Prahran Football Club players
Brighton Football Club players